The Grauer Kopf is a hill in Hesse, Germany.

Hills of Hesse
Rheingau-Taunus-Kreis
Mountains and hills of the Taunus